Ahmed Ibrahim Hijazi (1936–2011) was an Egyptian satirical cartoonist, known for his criticism of politicians and society.

References

External links
 

1936 births
2011 deaths
Egyptian cartoonists
Egyptian satirists